= The Spektator =

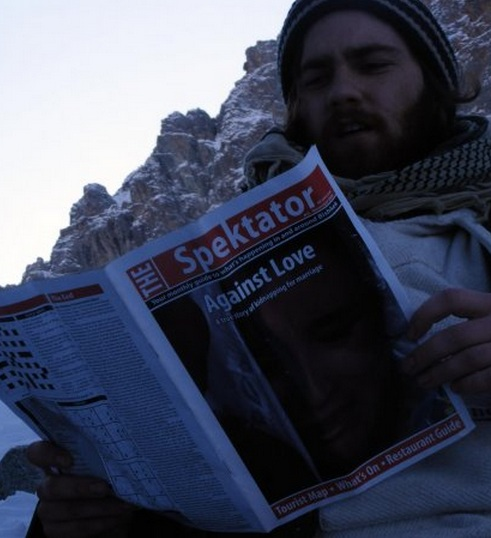
- Cover of issue two of the Spektator
- Type: Monthly Magazine
- Format: A4
- Owner(s): Tom Wellings
- Publisher: Gwladys Street Publishing
- Editor: Chris Rickleton
- Founded: 1 October 2008
- Language: English
- Headquarters: Kyrgyzstan
- Circulation: 1,500
- Price: Free
- Website: bishkekspektator.com

The Spektator is a former English-language magazine published in Kyrgyzstan.

The magazine was published between October 2008 and June 2013 by Gwladys Street Publishing, a British owned company registered in Kyrgyzstan, and covered social and cultural issues in Kyrgyzstan and the wider Central Asian region. It also featured a city guide to Bishkek, the capital city of Kyrgyzstan.

Its target readership included Kyrgyzstanis with a good command of English, students at universities, foreign companies established in Kyrgyzstan, as well as foreigners who were either living and working in Kyrgyzstan or were preparing to do so.
